I Feel Sleepy is an Iranian film directed by Reza Attaran. In the film, the male actor Akbar Abdi portrays an old woman.

Plot
Reza is a middle age teacher who has trouble communicating with women, but now falls in love with a saleswoman.

Cast
 Reza Attaran
 Akbar Abdi
 Merila Zarei
 Vishka Asayesh
 Nasser Gitijah
 Soroush Sehhat
 Fatemeh Hashemi
 Asghar Samsarzadeh
 Hossein Mohebhaheri
 Khodadad Azizi
 Ezzatullah Mehravaran

Awards
 Crystal Simorgh for best directing (Reza Attaran) in Fajr International Film Festival
 Crystal Simorgh for best supporting actor (Akbar Abdi) in Fajr International Film Festival

References

External links
 

2010s Persian-language films
Iranian comedy-drama films
Cross-dressing in film
2012 comedy-drama films
2012 drama films
2012 films